Jayson Antonie Granger Amodio (born September 15, 1989) is a Uruguayan professional basketball player for Reyer Venezia of the Italian Lega Basket Serie A (LBA) and the EuroCup. Listed at a height of 6'2" (1.89 m) tall without shoes, and 200 lbs. (91 kg) in weight, he plays at both the point guard and shooting guard positions.

Professional career

Youth levels
Granger, a native of Montevideo, Uruguay, played in the youth ranks of the Uruguayan club Club Atlético Cordón .

Estudiantes

In December 2005, Granger had a trial with the Spanish team Estudiantes, and he signed with them in 2006, at only 16.

However, Granger's Uruguayan club, Cordón, requested a formation indemnity, meaning that Granger could only play in the amateur Spanish 4th-tier level Liga EBA, for one-and-a-half years, whilst a FIBA tribunal was deciding the case. The tribunal finally awarded the Uruguayan side €25,000 as compensation in 2007, with Granger being very critical of his former team's actions.

During the summer of 2007, he participated in the Americas Basketball Without Borders camp, and he was selected as the camp MVP. Granger made his Spanish 1st-tier level Liga ACB professional debut during the 2007–08 season. During the 2012–13 Spanish ACB season, he averaged 11 points and 3.4 assists per game in the Spanish Liga ACB.

Unicaja
Granger played in the 2013 NBA Summer League, in July 2013, with the Boston Celtics' summer league squad, posting 6 points and 3.6 assists per game, in around 18 minutes per game, in 5 games played. After his contract with Estudiantes expired, he signed with the Spanish club Unicaja, later that same month, for an offer his former team couldn't match.

Granger played in the 2014 NBA Summer League, in July 2014, with the Cleveland Cavaliers' summer league squad, where he had averages of 2.3 points and 1 assist per game, in about 9 minutes per game, in 4 games played.

Granger was selected to the All-Spanish ACB League Team of the 2014–15 season, after being selected as one of the league's two best guards, along with Sergio Llull. He averaged 9.7 points, 3.3 rebounds, 5.2 assists, and 1.2 steals per game in the Spanish ACB League's regular season. He also played a key role in his team's run to the Spanish ACB League playoff semifinals.

Anadolu Efes
On 26 June 2015, Granger signed a two-year contract with the Turkish team Anadolu Efes.

Baskonia
On August 16, 2017, Granger signed a three-year deal with Baskonia of Liga ACB and the EuroLeague.

Alba Berlin
On August 1, 2020, he has signed with Alba Berlin of the Basketball Bundesliga.

Return to Baskonia
On July 13, 2021, Granger officially returned to Baskonia, signing a two-year deal.

Reyer Venezia
On July 4, 2022, he has signed with Reyer Venezia of the Lega Basket Serie A (LBA).

National team career
Granger first played for the Uruguayan Under-16 junior national basketball team at the 2004 South American Championship for Cadets. In the 2005 FIBA South America Under-17 Championship, he led his team in scoring (26.6 points per game), rebounding (8.2 per game), and assists (4 per game), while also leading the whole tournament in scoring, as Uruguay reached the tournament's final.
In the 2006 FIBA Americas Under-18 Championship, he posted team-leading 16.5 points per game (also 5th best for the tournament) and 6.8 assists per game (2nd best in the tournament).

However, Granger did not play with the senior Uruguayan national basketball team in the 2008 South American Championship, as the Uruguayan Basketball Federation refused his request to pay for his girlfriend's plane ticket to the tournament. He also turned down a selection to senior national team to play at the 2009 FIBA Americas Championship, citing an injury that the Uruguayan team doctors argued did not prevent him from playing. Granger also publicly expressed his resentment at the Uruguayan Basketball Federation, for their role in the dispute regarding his transfer, from Uruguay to Spain, in 2005 (see Professional career).

Granger would finally play with the senior Uruguayan national basketball team at the 2012 South American Championship, where he averaged 12.8 points per game (3rd on the team), 5.4 rebounds per game (2nd on the team), and 3.2 assists per game (1st on the team). The Uruguayan side finished the tournament in 3rd place, after losing in the semifinals to Argentina, despite Granger's 26 points, 9 rebounds, and 3 assists in the game.

He did not play at the 2013 FIBA Americas Championship, citing the need to take the time off, in order to properly integrate himself into his new club team, Unicaja.

Personal life
Jayson Granger is the son of Jeff Granger, a New Jersey born American professional basketball player, who played in the Uruguayan League in the early 1980s. He became a Uruguayan citizen, and played for the senior Uruguayan national basketball team. He settled in at Montevideo, Uruguay, where Jayson was born.

Career statistics

EuroLeague

|-
| style="text-align:left;"| 2013–14
| style="text-align:left;" rowspan="2"| Unicaja
| 24 || 7 || 21.3 || .408 || .293 || .861 || 2.1 || 3.4 || .6 || .0 || 7.5 || 8.5
|-
| style="text-align:left;"| 2014–15
| 23 || 8 || 25.6 || .404 || .316 || .760 || 2.7 || 4.2 || .9 || .3 || 10.2 || 12.1
|-
| style="text-align:left;"| 2015–16
| style="text-align:left;" rowspan="2"| Anadolu Efes
| 23 || 14 || 26.2 || .448 || .315 || .689 || 3.1 || 3.9 || .7 || .0 || 10.2 || 10.8
|-
| style="text-align:left;"| 2016–17
| 35 || 32 || 25.3 || .463 || .327 || .753 || 2.7 || 3.9 || .9 || .1 || 9.7 || 10.3
|-
| style="text-align:left;"| 2017–18
| style="text-align:left;" rowspan="2"| Baskonia
| 31 || 23 || 21.4 || .472 || .405 || .737 || 1.9 || 5.1 || .5 || .0 || 9.3 || 11.3
|-
| style="text-align:left;"| 2018–19
| 12 || 5 || 19.3 || .370 || .405 || .643 || 1.6 || 2.4 || .3 || .0 || 7.2 || 5.7
|-
|- class="sortbottom"
| style="text-align:center;" colspan="2" | Career
| 148 || 89 || 23.6 || .410 || .347 || .751 || 2.4 || 4.0 || .7 || .1 || 9.2 || 10.2

References

External links
 Euroleague.net Profile Retrieved 28 June 2015
 Spanish Liga ACB Profile Retrieved 28 June 2015 
 Eurobasket.com Profile Retrieved 28 June 2015
 
 Draftexpress.com Profile
 FIBA Archive Profile

1989 births
Living people
Alba Berlin players
Anadolu Efes S.K. players
Baloncesto Málaga players
CB Estudiantes players
Liga ACB players
Point guards
Reyer Venezia players
Saski Baskonia players
Shooting guards
Uruguayan expatriate basketball people in Spain
Uruguayan expatriate basketball people in Turkey
Uruguayan men's basketball players
Uruguayan people of American descent
Uruguayan people of Italian descent